Zaim Divanović (born 9 December 2000) is a Montenegrin football player who plays as a central midfielder for Russian club Akhmat Grozny.

Career
On 12 January 2023, Divanović signed a three-and-a-half-year contract with Russian Premier League club Akhmat Grozny. He made his RPL debut for Akhmat on 11 March 2023 in a game against Lokomotiv Moscow.

References

External links
 
 

2000 births
Living people
Montenegrin footballers
Montenegro youth international footballers
Montenegro under-21 international footballers
Association football midfielders
OFK Titograd players
OFK Petrovac players
FC Shakhtyor Soligorsk players
FC Akhmat Grozny players
Montenegrin First League players
Montenegrin Second League players
Belarusian Premier League players
Russian Premier League players
Montenegrin expatriate footballers
Expatriate footballers in Belarus
Montenegrin expatriate sportspeople in Belarus
Expatriate footballers in Russia
Montenegrin expatriate sportspeople in Russia